Manchester Jazz Festival is an annual 9-day-long festival focused on showcasing contemporary jazz from the North West of England and beyond.

mjf 2017 
The 2017 Manchester Jazz Festival took place from 28 July to 6 August in Manchester city centre.

History 
The Manchester Jazz Festival was created in 1996 as a one-day showcase and has grown into a 9-day event, with 60 gigs and 300 musicians planned for July 2009.

Key dates and figures for the festival:

1996: 1st Manchester Jazz Festival - 1 day, 1 venue, 10 bands 
2000: 1st new jazz work commissioned by the festival 
2003: 1st mjf all-day finale in Albert Square, with 5 bands, 50 musicians and 5,000 attenders 
2006: 1st ever jazz festival podcast in the UK – won the Independent’s Critics’ Choice 
2017: 1st ever visit by JJ
 
More details are available on the festival website.

Funders and supporters

Public funders
Manchester Jazz Festival is an Arts Council England's Regularly Funded Organisation since 1999. 
It is one of Manchester City Council's Pillar Event since 2003. 
It also regularly receive financial support from the PRS Foundation for New Music to foster new talents and develop new works.

Cultural supporters
The festival's international programme is supported by the Instituto Cervantes Manchester and the Italian Consulate.

Private supporters
The Festival is supported by businesses in Manchester, including The Midland Hotel, Susi Madron's Cycling for Softies, and Lloyd Piggott Chartered Accountants.

Commissions 

From 2000, Manchester Jazz Festival has been commissioning North West artists to help them develop ambitious projects. Previously commissioned artists include Richard Iles, Jon Thorne (with Danny Thompson), Stuart McCallum (with John Surman), Mike Walker (with Adam Nussbaum).

In 2008, the festival has been allocated an increase in core funding from Arts Council England to develop its commitment to new jazz works and to actively encourage innovative artistic creation on the part of the region’s jazz community. This new strand, called "mjf originals", is open to submissions. The first recipients, whose work will be premiered in July 2009, are Olivia Moore and Matt Owens.

mjf in the press and media
mjf 2007 review in Jazzwise
The Ring Modulator mjf 2008 review

External links 
 Official Manchester Jazz Festival website
 NWJazzworks, the support and development agency for jazz in the North West of England
 Arts Council England, the national development agency for the arts in England
 Manchester City Council
 PRS Foundation for New Music

References 

Music festivals in Greater Manchester
Jazz festivals in the United Kingdom